Lycée Libanais Francophone Privé  (LLFP) is a Francophone Lebanese international school in Muhaisnah, Dubai.

It is considered to be a French international school by the AEFE. It serves levels petite section through terminale, the final year of lycée (senior high school/sixth form college).

It was established in 2003.

References

External links

 Lycée Libanais Francophone Privé 

French international schools in the United Arab Emirates
International schools in Dubai
2003 establishments in the United Arab Emirates
Educational institutions established in 2003